Poa paramoensis is a species of grass in the family Poaceae. It is found only in Ecuador.

References

paramoensis
Endemic flora of Ecuador
Least concern plants
Taxonomy articles created by Polbot